Weiz-Unterfladnitz Airport is a private use airport located  south-southeast of Weiz, Styria, Austria.

See also
List of airports in Austria

References

External links 
 Airport record for Weiz-Unterfladnitz Airport at Landings.com

Airports in Austria
Styria